The 1942 Women's Western Open was a golf competition held at Elmhurst Country Club in Addison, Illinois, which was the 13th edition of the event. Betty Jameson won the championship in match play competition by defeating Phyllis Otto in the final match, 9 and 7.

References

Women's Western Open
Addison, Illinois
Golf in Illinois
Women's Western Open
Women's Western Open
Women's Western Open
Women's sports in Illinois